Slovakia competed at the 2004 Summer Paralympics in Athens, Greece. The team included 37 athletes, 29 men and 8 women. Competitors from Slovakia won 12 medals, including 5 gold, 3 silver and 4 bronze to finish 30th in the medal table.

Medallists

Sports

Archery

Men

|-
|align=left|Miroslav Kacina
|align=left|Men's individual W2
|547
|30
|N/A
|L 135-159
|colspan=4|did not advance
|-
|align=left|Jaroslav Lazo
|align=left rowspan=3|Men's individual standing
|573
|18
|N/A
|L 127-137
|colspan=4|did not advance
|-
|align=left|Imrich Lyocsa
|611
|3
|N/A
|W 147-134
|W 95-86
|W 104-92
|W *103-103
|
|-
|align=left|Vladimir Majercak
|606
|7
|colspan=2|N/A
|L 143-152
|colspan=3|did not advance
|-
|align=left|Jaroslav Lazo Imrich Lyocsa Vladimir Majercak
|align=left|Men's team
|1790
|8
|N/A
|W *209-209
|L 213-217
|colspan=3|did not advance
|}

Imrich Lyocsa's gold medal match against Poland's Tomasz Lezanski was decided by additional arrows. Lyocsa won 8 arrows to 5 and won the gold medal.
The men's team round of 16 match against Spain was decided by additional arrows. They won 26 arrows to 18 and progressed to the quarterfinals.

Athletics

Men's track

Men's field

Boccia

Cycling

Men's road

Men's track (individual)

Men's track (tandem)

Vladislav Janovjak and Juraj Petrovic were stripped of their silver medals after Petrovic was tested positive for banned substances. The silver medals were awarded to Japan's Shigeo Yoshihara and Takuya Oki.

Powerlifting

Men

Women

Sailing

Shooting

Men

Women

Swimming

Men

Women

Table tennis

Men

Women

Teams

Wheelchair tennis

Men

See also
Slovakia at the Paralympics
Slovakia at the 2004 Summer Olympics

References 

Nations at the 2004 Summer Paralympics
2004
Summer Paralympics